Gorbach (Russian: Горбач) is the surname of the following people:
Alfons Gorbach (1898–1972), Austrian politician 
Hubert Gorbach (born 1956), Austrian politician 
Pavel Gorbach (born 2000), Belarusian football player
Valeriy Gorbach (born 1968), Tajikistani football player